Jack Blain (born 21 February 2000) is a Scottish rugby union player for Edinburgh Rugby in the United Rugby Championship. Blain's primary position is wing.

Rugby Union career

Professional career

Blain made his debut for Edinburgh on 2 March 2019.

As well as being signed to Edinburgh, Blain also represents Heriot's Rugby in the Super 6 tournament.

International career

In June 2021 Blain was called up to the Scotland squad for the Summer internationals.

References

2000 births
Living people
Edinburgh Rugby players
Rugby union wings
Heriot's RC players
Scottish rugby union players